Lemyrea is a genus of flowering plants belonging to the family Rubiaceae.

Its native range is Madagascar.

Species:

Lemyrea ciliolata 
Lemyrea krugii 
Lemyrea marojejyensis 
Lemyrea utilis

References

Rubiaceae
Rubiaceae genera
Taxa named by Auguste Chevalier